Murilo de Souza Costa (born 31 October 1994), sometimes known as just Murilo, is a Brazilian professional footballer who plays as a winger for Portuguese club Gil Vicente F.C.

Career

Internacional
Born in São José do Norte, Rio Grande do Sul, Murilo Costa played once as a substitute for Sociedade Esportiva e Recreativa Caxias do Sul in the 2012 Campeonato Gaúcho before joining Sport Club Internacional of the same league. He made six appearances as they won the 2014 title, and scored once in a 2–1 win at Esporte Clube Passo Fundo on 26 January.

In late September 2014, Murilo Costa signed a two-year contract with Campeonato Brasileiro Série A club Botafogo de Futebol e Regatas. The team were runners-up in the 2015 Campeonato Carioca, though his input was just two substitute appearances; that September he was loaned to Macaé Esporte Futebol Clube for the Série B season, playing just three games from the bench.

Murilo returned to his home state in January 2016, joining Clube Esportivo Lajeadense on loan for the Campeonato Gaúcho season. After their relegation, he headed to Joinville Esporte Clube for three months on 4 April. The team finished as runners-up in the Campeonato Catarinense, and he scored in a 1–1 draw at Esporte Clube Comercial (MS) in the first round of the Copa do Brasil on 21 April (2–1 aggregate win).

Juventude / Nacional
In December 2016, Murilo Costa left Internacional for Esporte Clube Juventude in the same state. He played seven games in the 2017 Gauchão season, scoring the only goal of a home win over Ypiranga Futebol Clube on 12 February.

On 9 June 2017, Murilo moved abroad for the first time, loaned to C.D. Nacional who had recently been relegated to Portugal's LigaPro. He was the Madeiran club's second top scorer behind Ricardo Gomes – fifth overall – with 13 goals as they won promotion as champions; this included braces with a late equaliser in a 3–3 draw at Académico de Viseu F.C. on 18 February and in a 6–0 home win over FC Porto B on 7 March.

Braga
On 1 July 2018, shortly after Nacional's promotion, Murilo Costa signed a five-year deal with fellow Primeira Liga club S.C. Braga. He scored his first goal for them the following 18 January in a 3–0 win on his return to the Estádio da Madeira, having previously played seven minutes in the league all season.

Sporting Gijón (loan)
On 31 January 2020, Murilo Costa was loaned to Spanish club Sporting de Gijón until the end of the season.

Mallorca (loan)
On 17 September 2020, Murilo Costa joined fellow second division side RCD Mallorca on loan for the 2020–21 season.

Career statistics

Club

Honorus
Internacional
Campeonato Gaúcho: 2014

Nacional
LigaPro: 2017–18

Braga
Taça da Liga: 2019–20

References

External links

1994 births
Living people
Sportspeople from Rio Grande do Sul
Brazilian footballers
Association football midfielders
Campeonato Brasileiro Série A players
Campeonato Brasileiro Série B players
Sociedade Esportiva e Recreativa Caxias do Sul players
Sport Club Internacional players
Botafogo de Futebol e Regatas players
Macaé Esporte Futebol Clube players
Clube Esportivo Lajeadense players
Joinville Esporte Clube players
Esporte Clube Juventude players
Primeira Liga players
Liga Portugal 2 players
C.D. Nacional players
S.C. Braga players
Gil Vicente F.C. players
Segunda División players
Sporting de Gijón players
RCD Mallorca players
Brazilian expatriate footballers
Brazilian expatriate sportspeople in Portugal
Brazilian expatriate sportspeople in Spain
Expatriate footballers in Portugal
Expatriate footballers in Spain